The Simpson Group is a geologic group in Oklahoma. It preserves fossils dating back to the Ordovician period.

See also

 List of fossiliferous stratigraphic units in Oklahoma
 Paleontology in Oklahoma

References
 

Geologic groups of Oklahoma
Ordovician System of North America